Lukas Haudum (born 21 May 1997) is an Austrian professional ice hockey centre playing for EC KAC of the ICE Hockey League (ICEHL).

Haudem previously played in the Swedish Hockey League (SHL) for the Malmö Redhawks.

References

External links

1997 births
Living people
Austrian ice hockey centres
EHC Black Wings Linz players
EC KAC players
Malmö Redhawks players
IK Pantern players
Sportspeople from Linz